Glenn Andrew Parker (born April 22, 1966 in Westminster, California) is a former American football offensive lineman in the National Football League who played for the Buffalo Bills, the Kansas City Chiefs, and the New York Giants. After his retirement, he became a television NFL analyst.

Biography

Playing career
Parker attended Edison High School in Huntington Beach, but was not in the athletics programs.  He first played for Golden West College, a junior college in Huntington Beach.

That led him to Arizona, where he played for the University of Arizona and was drafted in the third round of the 1990 NFL Draft by the Buffalo Bills.  He played for the Bills until 1997, playing in all four Super Bowls the team lost from 1990-1993.  He then went to play three years for the Chiefs, then was released during the 2000 offseason.  He was picked up as a free agent by the Giants, where he played two more seasons, and was an integral part of the Super Bowl XXXV team.  He retired after the 2001 season after being released by the Giants, being one of only three players (along with Cornelius Bennett and Gale Gilbert) to play in, and be on the losing team in five separate Super Bowls.  He started in 141 of the 174 games he played, as well as all 16 of his postseason appearances.

Broadcasting career
Parker has been an analyst on the NFL Network's Playbook since late 2003, and is the main college football analyst for the CBS College Sports Network, The AFL on NBC. Parker also has appeared on Fox Sports, covering features on NFL Europa, and appeared on ESPN's NFL 2Nite.  He was also one of the main analysts for College Football on Versus. Starting the 2012 season, he can be heard as the lead college football analyst for the new Pac-12 Network. He has also called Arizona Cardinals preseason games with Mike Goldberg.

He was previously the host of In The House, airing on KCUB-AM in Tucson, Arizona.

Personal life
Fairly well known for his culinary and wine interests, he appeared on The Food Network.

He is also known for visiting Afton Central School, a rural school in upstate NY. His visit inspired many.

Glenn Parker is married, with four children, named Madeleine, Emily, and William and Caroline.  They live in Tucson, Arizona.

References

1966 births
Living people
People from Westminster, California
American football offensive guards
Arizona Wildcats football players
Buffalo Bills players
Kansas City Chiefs players
New York Giants players
College football announcers
Arena football announcers
National Football League announcers
NFL Europe broadcasters
Arizona Cardinals announcers
Players of American football from California
Sportspeople from Orange County, California
Golden West Rustlers football players
Ed Block Courage Award recipients